Pirogovka is a rural locality (a selo) in Akhtubinsky District, Astrakhan Oblast, Russia. The population was 816 as of 2010. There are 20 streets.

Geography 
Pirogovka is located 67 km southeast of Akhtubinsk (the district's administrative centre) by road. Sokrutovka is the nearest rural locality.

References 

Rural localities in Akhtubinsky District